Rusudan was a 12th-13th-century Georgian princess of the Bagrationi royal family. She was a daughter of King Demetrius I of Georgia, sister of the kings David V and George III, wife of Manuchihr II of Shirvan, and a paternal aunt of the famous Queen Tamar of Georgia.

Around 1143 she married sultan Masud Temirek, but the marriage only lasted a few years before his death 2 October 1152. She later married Ahmed Sanjar, a Seljuk sultan. When her second husband died, she married Manuchihr II of Shirvan, returned to Georgia and ruled over it as a regent in the first years of Queen Tamar’s reign. She was also a tutor and patron of the Alan prince Soslan-David whom Tamar married as her second husband in 1189. Some historians believe that in 1154 Rusudan was also married to Iziaslav II of Kiev, possibly confusing her with her sister Bagrationi. After the death of David Soslan, she went to Shirvanshah where she ruled the kingdom along with her husband Manuchihr II of Shirvan.

In her eighties, Rusudan withdrew to a monastery c. 1210.

Further reading
Toumanoff, Cyril. On the Relationship between the Founder of the Empire of Trebizond and the Georgian Queen Thamar. Speculum, Vol. 15, No. 3. (Jul., 1940), p. 305.

References

12th-century women from Georgia (country)
13th-century women from Georgia (country)
Bagrationi dynasty of the Kingdom of Georgia
Princesses from Georgia (country)
12th-century births
13th-century deaths
Remarried royal consorts
Regents of Georgia
12th-century women rulers